Sieniawa may refer to the following places:
Sieniawa, Lesser Poland Voivodeship (south Poland)
Sieniawa in Subcarpathian Voivodeship (south-east Poland)
Sieniawa, Krosno County in Subcarpathian Voivodeship (south-east Poland)
Sieniawa, Lubusz Voivodeship (west Poland)
Sieniawa, West Pomeranian Voivodeship (north-west Poland)